WWE Podcast Network is a series of podcasts produced and distributed by the American professional wrestling promotion WWE.

In August 2019, WWE and Endeavor announced an expansion of their current arrangement for the WWE Network, to expand it to the production of podcasts.

In October 2019, the first podcast, After The Bell hosted by Corey Graves, was announced. The following month, the second podcast, The New Day: Feel The Power hosted by The New Day (Big E, Kofi Kingston, and Xavier Woods), was announced.

In April 2020, WWE added their third podcast, WWE's The Bump. The podcast was an audio version of their web series, featuring highlights and interviews from the show. The audio version of The Bump ran for 24 episodes before concluding in July 2020.

In June 2020, it was announced that WWE would add a fourth podcast. In an interview with Fox Sports, Alexa Bliss confirmed she would be hosting the podcast. The podcast, titled Uncool with Alexa Bliss, debuted in September 2020. The podcast featured various WWE wrestlers and celebrities discussing uncool things they did when they were younger. The show ran for 12 episodes between September and December 2020.

References

WWE Network
2019 introductions
Podcasting companies
Professional wrestling podcasters